Semiothisa cinerearia is a moth of the family Geometridae first described by Otto Vasilievich Bremer and Vasilii Fomich Grey in 1853. It is found in China and its major host plant is Styphnolobium japonicum.

Subspecies
Semiothisa cinerearia cinerearia
Semiothisa cinerearia eurytaenia (Wehrli 1932)

References

Moths described in 1853
Macariini
Moths of Asia